The 1922–23 season was the first season played by the Sphas in the Philadelphia League, and the only season played by the team in the Manufacturer's League. In the Manufacturer's League, made up of teams from local industry, the Sphas were known as Philadelphia Passon, Gottlieb, Black because they competed on behalf of the owners' sporting goods store. The team was known as the Sphas in the Philadelphia League. Game-by-game records not available for this season.

References 

Philadelphia Sphas seasons